The 1927 Toledo Rockets football team was an American football team that represented Toledo University (renamed the University of Toledo in 1967) during the 1927 college football season. Led by first-year coach Boni Petcoff, Toledo compiled a 5–2 overall record and 3–0 in conference play, earning the Northwest Ohio League championship.

Schedule

References

Toledo
Toledo Rockets football seasons
Northwest Ohio League football champion seasons
Toledo Rockets football